is a single by Japanese idol girl group French Kiss, a sub-unit of AKB48. It was released on November 22, 2011. It debuted in number one on the weekly Oricon Singles Chart and, as of May 7, 2012 (issue date), had sold 154,223 copies. It also reached 2nd place on the Billboard Japan Hot 100.

References 

2011 singles
2011 songs
Japanese-language songs
French Kiss (band) songs
Oricon Weekly number-one singles